AMOS or Advanced Mortar System is a Finno-Swedish 120 mm automatic twin barrelled, breech loaded
mortar turret. AMOS has been fitted to a wide range of armoured vehicles, such as the Sisu Pasi, Patria AMV and Combat Vehicle 90. The Swedish Navy originally planned to fit AMOS to the CB90 assault craft, but found that it was too small to carry it. Instead, a project to develop the larger Combat Boat 2010 was launched specifically to carry AMOS. Sweden cancelled its acquisition of the AMOS in 2009 due to budget regulations by recommendations from Genomförandegruppen. In 2016 a new self propelled mortar system called Mjölner based on a CV90 hull was ordered by the Swedish armed forces, it is based on the AMOS and has many visual similarities but is not as advanced.

Design 
When fitted to a vehicle, both GPS- and inertia positioning are used. The electronic fire-control system utilizes digital maps. The twin barreled AMOS is able to keep up rate of fire of 12 rounds per minute. Using its computer-controlled Multiple round simultaneous impact (MRSI) feature it is possible to set up a burst of up to 10 rounds that hit the target simultaneously. The first rounds are fired at higher angles with more propellant so that the rounds fly in a high arc. The next rounds are shot later with a slightly smaller angle and less propellant so that they fly a lower arc to the same target. This can be done seven times in a row, always adjusting the angle and power. The adjustment between shots is done by a computer. The strike of one AMOS unit roughly equals one strike of an artillery battery.

An AMOS turret has a full 360-degree field of fire at elevations of −3 to +85 degrees. AMOS is capable of both conventional indirect fire and direct fire for self-protection. In a typical installation, mounted on a Patria AMV or a similar vehicle, the vehicle can dash to the next position roughly 30 seconds after initiating the 14-round salvo, leaving minimal time for detection and counter-attack by enemy; evasion is the primary means of self-protection.

AMOS is manufactured and marketed by Finnish/Swedish Patria Hägglunds, a joint venture between Finnish Patria and Swedish BAE Systems Hägglunds. The system was to be known as the SSG120 in Swedish service. Ammunition for AMOS includes the Strix guided round and a modification of the Spanish Instalaza MAT-120 120 mm Mortar Cargo Round (although the latter is restricted from the Finnish inventory because of Finnish partnership in the Ottawa Treaty abolishing landmines). AMOS is capable of firing standard muzzle-loaded mortar rounds, but due to the breech-load design in the AMOS, the rounds have to be equipped with a short stub case at the base of the fins, similar to a sabot. When the round is fired, the case exits the breech system automatically.

Operators

Current operators

See also
 Patria NEMO
 Light-weight Combat Vehicle (LCV) System
 M120 Rak

References

External links
 AMOS at Patria Hägglunds's website Rev 7.3.2012
 AMOS Advanced Mortar System and Amos Brochure 2008 at www.patria.fi. Rev. 7.3.2012
Instalaza news web page

120 mm artillery
Mortars of Finland
Mortars of Sweden
Gun-mortars
Military vehicles introduced in the 2000s